Premaku Swagatam ( Welcome to love) is a 2002 Indian Telugu-language romance film, directed by S. V. Krishna Reddy and starring J. D. Chakravarthy and Soundarya.

Plot
Lahari (Soundarya), daughter of a millionaire, Mahendra (Prakash Raj) falls in love with her car driver Balaji (J. D. Chakravarthy). Lahari announces her love towards Balaji in her birthday party. Mahendra and Balaji don't want her to marry Balaji as he is poor. They make an agreement; Lahari is to stay in Balaji's small house with his big family. Mahendra learns that Balaji also loves Lahari, but he refuses because he is poor. Finally, Balaji agrees to marry Lahari.

Cast
 J. D. Chakravarthy as Balaji
 Soundarya as Lahari (Voice dubbed by Shilpa)
 Prakash Raj as Mahendra
 Sunil as Tenali
 Brahmanandam
 M. S. Narayana
 Annapoorna as Balaji's mother
 L. B. Sriram as Balaji's father
 Allu Ramalingaiah as Balaji's grandfather
 Surya
 Delhi Rajeswari as Lahari's mother
 Gundu Hanumantha Rao as Chef
 Manya

Soundtrack

Reception 
Idlebrain.com gave the film two stars out of five and wrote "This film has nothing to offer. It's a boring proposition right from the scene one."

References

External links
 

2002 films
2000s Telugu-language films
2000s romance films
Films directed by S. V. Krishna Reddy
Films scored by S. V. Krishna Reddy
Indian romance films